Phang Khon is a district (amphoe) of Sakon Nakhon province, Thailand.

Geography
Neighboring districts are (from the north clockwise): Wanon Niwat, Phanna Nikhom, Waritchaphum and Sawang Daen Din.

The Nam Un Dam is in the district.

History
The minor district (king amphoe) was created on 20 March 1968, when the three tambons Muang Khai, Hai Yong, and Rae were split off from Phanna Nikhom district. It was upgraded to a full district on 16 November 1971.

Administration 
The district is divided into five sub-districts (tambons), which are further subdivided into 70 villages (mubans). Phang Khon is a township (thesaban tambon) which covers parts of tambon Phang Khon. There are a further five tambon administrative organizations (TAO).

References

External links
amphoe.com

Phang Khon